Nam Yun-Bae (Hangul: 남윤배) (born in Seongnam, Gyeonggi-do, South Korea) is a South Korean taekwondo practitioner.

In 2004, he won the gold medal in heavyweight and was named MVP at the World Youth Taekwondo Championships held in Suncheon, South Korea.

In 2005, Nam won the gold medal in heavyweight at the Summer Universiade, and claimed another gold medal at the 2006 World Cup Taekwondo in Bangkok, Thailand.

However, Nam didn't qualify for the 2008 Summer Olympics as he lost to heavyweight rival Cha Dong-Min in the Korean Olympic trials.

Nam won the silver medal at the 2009 World Taekwondo Championships held in Copenhagen, Denmark. This was a step up from the championships held in Beijing 2007, where he won bronze.

References

Living people
South Korean male taekwondo practitioners
Universiade medalists in taekwondo
Year of birth missing (living people)
Universiade gold medalists for South Korea
World Taekwondo Championships medalists
Asian Taekwondo Championships medalists
People from Seongnam
Sportspeople from Gyeonggi Province
21st-century South Korean people